Bradley Kirk Arnold (born September 27, 1978) is an American musician, best known as the lead singer and drummer (and only remaining original member) of the rock band 3 Doors Down.

Early life 
Arnold grew up in Escatawpa, Mississippi. He wrote the song "Kryptonite" in high school during math class at age 15.

Career 
Arnold is a founding member of 3 Doors Down, and was 16 years old at the time of the band's formation. Arnold was initially both a drummer and a singer, before focusing on the latter role around the time guitarist Chris Henderson joined the band. He has been sober for over 5 years and the only clean member of the original band. Matt Roberts left and later died from substance overdose and Harrel was arrested for a buzzed car crash.

Discography

Personal life 
Arnold is a recovering alcoholic who stopped drinking in 2016. He was married to his first wife Terika Roberts from 2001 to 2007. He married his second wife, Jennifer Sanderford, in 2009. One of Brad's hobbies is deep sea fishing.

References 

1978 births
Singers from Mississippi
Living people
3 Doors Down members
People from Jackson County, Mississippi
21st-century American singers
American baritones
American drummers